Heligmosomoides thomomyos is a parasitic nematode.  It was identified from the gastrointestinal tract of the Camas pocket gopher (Thomomys bulbivorus).

References

Rhabditida
Parasites of rodents
Parasitic nematodes of mammals